The tarada (Arabic: طرادة) is a large canoe used by the Marsh Arabs with a long, tapered prow and stern that curve up from the waterline. It is traditionally made from wood or reeds coated in bitumen and held together with the help of iron nails. The wood used is typically acacia or mulberry. British explorer Wilfred Thesiger described them thus:

Taradas are traditionally propelled by poling using a type of setting pole called a marda (مردى). In deeper water, oars made from wood and reed are used instead.

Historically the tarada was used as a war canoe or to transport important sheikhs. Iron-plated taradas were used by British and Ottoman forces and their local allies during the Mesopotamian Campaign of World War I. It is considered a type of mashoof. 

Most modern taradas are built in the towns of Al-Chibayish and Huwair.

References

Canoes
Marsh Arabs
Iraqi culture